The Daily Northwestern is the student newspaper at Northwestern University which is published in print on Mondays and Thursdays and online daily during the academic year. Founded in 1881, and printed in Evanston, Illinois, it is staffed primarily by undergraduates, many of whom are students at Northwestern's Medill School of Journalism.

The Daily has won the Columbia Scholastic Press Association and Associated Collegiate Press Pacemaker Awards.

It is owned by Students Publishing Company, which also publishes Syllabus, the university yearbook. Current circulation is in excess of 7,500. The Daily Northwestern is the only daily for both Northwestern and Evanston.

The paper's offices are located on the third floor of Norris University Center on Northwestern's Evanston Campus.

In 2015, The Daily launched "The Campaign for the Future of The Daily Northwestern," a five-year fundraising campaign.

Early history
The Daily descends from two earlier publications, the Tripod and Vidette, the older of which began publishing in 1871. In 1881, in what is considered The Dailys founding moment, the two papers merged to become The Northwestern, which would only gradually shed its literary-journal roots. Publication increased to five days a week by 1910. Independence from the university followed in 1923.

Future Chicago Tribune reporter Genevieve Forbes Herrick (graduated 1916) was the first female editor-in-chief of The Daily Northwestern.

Notable alumni of The Daily Northwestern
 J.A. Adande - ESPN.com sports columnist
 Michael Jon Anderson - former editor, New York Times Book Review
 Kim Barker - ProPublica, author of "The Taliban Shuffle"
 Geraldine Baum - New York Bureau Chief for the Los Angeles Times and Pulitzer Prize winner
 Saul Bellow (published first short story in The Daily) - Nobel Prize-winning novelist
 Stephan Benzkofer - Chicago Tribune news editor
 Christine Brennan - USA Today sports columnist
 Elisabeth Bumiller - New York Times White House correspondent
 Rance Crain - president of Crain Communications Inc.
 Lester Crystal - retired executive producer, News Hour with Jim Lehrer
 R. Bruce Dold - Pulitzer Prize-winning editorialist, Chicago Tribune
 John J. Edwards III - Wall Street Journal deputy business editor
 Jonathan Eig - journalist and author
 David T. Friendly - film producer and Academy Award nominee
 Al From - Democratic Leadership Council CEO
 Jack W. Fuller - former Tribune Co. president and Pulitzer Prize winner
 Georgie Anne Geyer - editor, foreign correspondent, Chicago Daily News, L.A. Times
 Bob Greene - former columnist, Chicago Tribune; author
 Donal Henahan - Pulitzer Prize winner for music criticism
 Adam Horvath -- Wall Street Journal world news editor
 Stephen Hunter - Pulitzer Prize-winning film critic, Washington Post
 Maura Johnston - Music editor, Village Voice
 Jonathan M. Katz - author, former Associated Press correspondent
 Walter Kerr - Famed Pulitzer Prize-winning theater critic for the New York Times, namesake of a Broadway theater
 Vincent Laforet - Pulitzer Prize-winning photographer
 Robert Leighton - The New Yorker cartoonist
 Kerry Luft -- Chicago Tribune senior editor
 Jeffrey R. Lyon - Pulitzer Prize for Explanatory Reporting
 Edgar May - Pulitzer Prize winner for Local Reporting, served in the Vermont House of Representatives and Senate
 Garry Marshall - director, producer, famous for Happy Days, Laverne & Shirley, and Mork and Mindy.
 Robert E. Mulholland - former president, National Broadcasting Company
 Brent Musburger - ABC sportscaster
 John Musker - writer and director of Disney's The Little Mermaid and Aladdin
 Charles F. Neubauer - Pulitzer Prize winner (shared), LA Times reporter
 Bill Ostendorf - founder of Creative Circle Media Solutions, media trainer and software innovator
 Ralph Otwell - former Chicago Sun-Times editor
 Susan Page - USA Today White House correspondent
 Tom Philp - Pulitzer Prize winner
 Jim Puzzanghera - Los Angeles Times national business writer
 Daniel Roth - Conde Nast business writer, formerly of Fortune magazine
 Sidney Sheldon - novelist
 Richard Stolley - founding editor of People magazine
 Cheryl Lu-Lien Tan - author and journalist
 Steven Twomey - Pulitzer Prize winner for Feature Writing
 John Walter - former Atlanta Journal-Constitution executive editor
 David Weigel - Washington Post journalist
 Beth Whitehouse - Pulitzer Prize winner for Spot News Coverage (shared), author of The Match: "Savior Siblings" and One Family's Battle to Heal Their Daughter
 Michael Wilbon - Washington Post sports columnist and host of Pardon the Interruption
 Lois Wille - Pulitzer Prize winner for Editorial Writing, Chicago Tribune

References

External links
 The Daily Northwestern
 NU Library's 125th Anniversary Exhibit, 2006 
 The Daily Northwestern - Exhibit celebrates 125 years of The Daily
 Northwestern Syllabus Yearbook
 Northwestern University Archives, the Northwestern University Archives holds a complete run of The Daily Northwestern.

Northwestern University
Publications established in 1881
Student newspapers published in Illinois
1881 establishments in Illinois